The Sŭngri Refinery(승리정유공장) is a Russian-design oil refinery with a capacity of 2 million tons located in Sŏnbong-gun, Rasŏn Special Economic Zone, North Korea. It is served by the Sŭngri Line of the Korean State Railway.

Investment 
In 2013, Mongolian firm HBOil bought a 20% share in the refinery with intention to supply crude oil to Sŭngri and export refined products to Mongolia. In 2016, South Korean newspaper Korea Joongang Daily reported HBOil had withdrawn from the deal following pressure from the international community due to North Korea's ongoing nuclear weapon and missile testing. HBOil publicly denied the claims.

References

Oil refineries in North Korea
Korea–Soviet Union relations
Soviet foreign aid
Buildings and structures in Rason